Roast Battle Canada is a Canadian television comedy series, which premiered on CTV Comedy Channel in October 2021. An adaptation of the American series Jeff Ross Presents Roast Battle, the series presents battles in which pairs of comedians take turns roasting each other on stage, before a panel of judges who decide the winner of each battle.

The judges for the series are Russell Peters, Sabrina Jalees and K. Trevor Wilson, with Ennis Esmer serving as host of the series.

The first episode, featuring comedians Daniel Woodrow, Keith Pedro, Brittany Lyseng and Mike Rita, received a Canadian Screen Award nomination for best performance in a variety or sketch comedy program or series at the 10th Canadian Screen Awards in 2022. The second season premiere, featuring Salma Hindy, Sophie Buddle, Jean Paul and Ron Josol, was nominated in the same category at the 11th Canadian Screen Awards in 2023.

Episodes

Season 1

Season 2

References

Canadian television series based on American television series
2021 Canadian television series debuts
2020s Canadian comedy television series
CTV Comedy Channel original programming
Roast (comedy)
Canadian stand-up comedy television series